Alexis Omar Díaz (born September 28, 1996) is a Puerto Rican professional baseball pitcher for the Cincinnati Reds of Major League Baseball (MLB). The Reds selected Díaz in the 12th round of the 2015 MLB draft and he made his MLB debut in 2022.

Career
Díaz was drafted by the Cincinnati Reds in the 12th round of the 2015 Major League Baseball Draft. He made his professional debut for the Arizona League Reds, appearing in nine games. Díaz returned to the team in 2017 after missing the 2016 season due to injury, and pitched to a 4.94 ERA with 40 strikeouts in 13 appearances. In 2018, Díaz played for the rookie-level Greeneville Reds, posting a 3–3 record and 3.02 ERA with 67 strikeouts in 11 games (nine of them starts). He split the 2019 season between the AZL Reds and the Single-A Dayton Dragons, logging a 7–4 record and 5.19 ERA with 77 strikeouts in 59.0 innings pitched across 27 appearances for the two teams. Díaz did not play in a game in 2020 due to the cancellation of the minor league season because of the COVID-19 pandemic. In 2021, Díaz played for the Double-A Chattanooga Lookouts, posting a 3.83 ERA with 70 strikeouts in 42.1 innings across 35 contests.

The Reds added him to their 40-man roster following the 2021 season on November 19, 2021. On April 7, 2022, it was announced that Díaz had made the Opening Day roster out of Spring Training. He made his major league debut the following day against the Atlanta Braves, tossing a scoreless inning and collecting his first two strikeouts (Adam Duvall and Travis d'Arnaud). He earned his first save on May 17, 2022, in the tenth inning against the Cleveland Guardians.

Personal life
Díaz's brother, Edwin Díaz, is a professional baseball player who currently pitches for the New York Mets. Edwin earned a save on the same day that Díaz earned his first save, making them the third set of brothers to both earn a save on the same day in MLB history.

References

External links

1996 births
Living people
People from Humacao, Puerto Rico
Major League Baseball players from Puerto Rico
Major League Baseball pitchers
Cincinnati Reds players
Arizona League Reds players
Greeneville Reds players
Dayton Dragons players
Criollos de Caguas players
Chattanooga Lookouts players
Cangrejeros de Santurce (baseball) players
2023 World Baseball Classic players